Frances Mayli McCann (born 1989/1990) is a Scottish actress. She is best known for her work in theatre. She is the recipient of Laurence Olivier and WhatsOnStage Award nominations.

Early life
McCann was born and raised in Bishopbriggs, a suburb of Glasgow to a Hong Kong mother and a Scottish-Irish father. McCann attended Turnbull High School. She was a dancer and gymnast from the age of four. After discovering acting and singing, she auditioned for and joined the Glasgow Academy Musical Theatre Arts (now GPRO), graduating in 2009.

Career
McCann reportedly first appeared on television in the 2000s CBBC series Against All Odds as Melissa and the BBC Scotland soap opera River City as Mia. She was also a finalist on CITV's Britannia High. In 2009, she was cast in a tour of the music show Highland Heartbeat. She guest starred in a 2010 episode of the BBC Three series Lip Service.

In 2011, McCann made her West End debut as a diva in Priscilla, Queen of the Desert at the Palace Theatre. She returned to Priscilla, Queen of the Desert for its 2013 tour around the UK, this time as Cynthia.

McCann originated the role of Kylah in Our Ladies of Perpetual Succour, a stage adaptation of Alan Warner's novel The Sopranos in the play's 2015 Edinburgh Fringe Festival premiere. She took the character on tour later that year, to the National Theatre in 2016, and to the West End at the Duke of York's Theatre in 2017. McCann and the rest of the cast were jointly nominated for the Laurence Olivier Award for Best Actress in a Supporting Role.

In 2019, McCann had a recurring role as Niki in the fifth series of Shetland on BBC One. She also had a small role in Evita at the Regent's Park Open Air Theatre. She began playing Éponine on a tour of Les Misérables, but it was cut short due to the COVID-19 pandemic. In 2021, McCann appeared in the world premiere of Fantastically Great Women Who Changed the World at MAST Mayflower Studios in Southampton, as well as productions at the Royal Court and Almeida Theatre, and played Heather McNamara in the West End revival of Heathers: The Musical at the Theatre Royal Haymarket.

In February 2022, it was announced McCann would star as the titular Bonnie Parker in the original West End cast of Bonnie & Clyde opposite Jordan Luke Gage as Clyde Barrow. The show's original run took place in spring 2022 at the Arts Theatre. For her performance, McCann was nominated for a WhatsOnStage Award. In November 2022, it was announced Bonnie & Clyde would return to the West End in March 2023 at the Garrick Theatre with McCann and Gage reprising their roles.

Personal life
McCann is married to Australian actor Christopher Chung. They had a traditional Chinese ceremony in Melbourne in 2020 followed by a western wedding at Bothy Glasgow in 2021.

Filmography

Stage

Awards and nominations

References

External links
 Frances Mayli McCann at Conway van Gelder Grant

Living people
21st-century Scottish actresses
British actresses of Chinese descent
Scottish musical theatre actresses
Scottish people of Hong Kong descent
Scottish people of Irish descent
People from Bishopbriggs